"Tsubusa ni Koi" is a single release by the Japanese boyband Kanjani8. This release marks their 19th single. The single was used as the theme song for the Fuji Television drama, Zenkai Girl.

Track listing

Regular Edition
   (4:56)
 "I to U" (4:17)
  (4:00)
 "Hi & high" (3:19)
   (4:56)
 "I to U (Original Karaoke)" (4:17)
  (4:00)
 "Hi & high (Original Karaoke)" (3:15)

Limited Edition
   (4:56)
 "I to U" (4:17)

DVD
 Music Clip and Making

Charts

References

2011 singles
Kanjani Eight songs
Japanese television drama theme songs
Oricon Weekly number-one singles
Billboard Japan Hot 100 number-one singles